The Kidnapping of Kensington is a children's novel by Richard Hough under the pen name of Bruce Carter. It was first published by Hamish Hamilton in 1958 and illustrated by C. Walter Hodges. The novel has also been published under the title The Children Who Stayed Behind.

Plot summary
Brighton is braced for war. England’s coast has become the front line of the Second World War. Rolls of barbed wire line Brighton beach, soldiers scan the horizon, people wait nervously for an attack. When an emergency evacuation is announced, people hurry to pack up and get out, but in the panic Drake, Gillian and Sammy miss the last train. They soon discover they are not the only ones left behind.

1958 British novels
British children's novels
Children's historical novels
Hamish Hamilton books
Novels set in Brighton
Novels set during World War II
1958 children's books